Events from the year 2002 in Burkina Faso.

Incumbents
President: Blaise Compaoré
Prime Minister: Paramanga Ernest Yonli

Events

May
5 May – Burkinabe parliamentary election, 2002

Deaths

References

 
Years of the 21st century in Burkina Faso
2000s in Burkina Faso
Burkina Faso
Burkina Faso